The long-nosed mongoose (Xenogale naso) is a mongoose native to Central African wetlands and rainforests. It has been listed as Least Concern on the IUCN Red List since 1996. Although formerly classified in Herpestes, more recent studies indicate that it belongs in the monotypic genus Xenogale.

Distribution and habitat 
The long-nosed mongoose is native to wetlands and rainforests from the Niger Delta in Nigeria, Cameroon to the Central African Republic, Equatorial Guinea, Gabon, Republic of the Congo and Democratic Republic of the Congo.
It is one of the most water dependent species.

Behaviour and ecology 
It moves up to  daily in this area foraging for food. It chooses different locations as night-time resting places.

Threats 
The long-nosed mongoose's habitat is fragmented because of logging, mining, and slash-and-burn agricultural practices.
In Gabon, it is hunted for sale in bushmeat markets.

References

Mongooses
Mongooses of Africa
Mongoose, Collared
Mammals described in 1901
Taxa named by William Edward de Winton
Taxobox binomials not recognized by IUCN